Barbados have sent teams to fifteen Commonwealth Games. The first Games at which they competed were in 1954, and the only event since they have not attended was the 1986 Games. They have won twelve medals, with a twenty-eight-year medal drought between 1970 and 1998.

Medals

See also
Sport in Barbados
Barbados at the Olympics
Barbados at the Pan American Games
Barbados at the Paralympics

References

 
Nations at the Commonwealth Games